Somewhere in Queens is a 2022 American comedy film directed by Ray Romano from a screenplay by Romano and Mark Stegemann. The film stars Laurie Metcalf and Romano. It premiered at the Tribeca Film Festival on June 10, 2022.  It is scheduled to be released in the United States on April 21, 2023, by Roadside Attractions.

Cast
 Ray Romano as Leo Russo
 Laurie Metcalf as Angela Russo
 Sadie Stanley as Dani Brooks
 Jacob Ward as "Sticks"
 Jennifer Esposito
 Dierdre Friel
 Jon Manfrellotti
 Sebastian Maniscalco
 Tony Lo Bianco
 Franco Maicas
 Danny Garcia
 Erik Griffin
 June Gable
 Adam Kaplan 
 Katie Kreisler 
 Jennifer Simard

Production
In February 2021, it was reported that Ray Romano would direct and star in an untitled film alongside Laurie Metcalf from a screenplay he wrote with Mark Stegemann. In May 2021, Sebastian Maniscalco, Jacob Ward, Sadie Stanley, Jennifer Esposito, Dierdre Friel, Jon Manfrellotti, Danny Garcia, Erik Griffin, June Gable, Tony Lo Bianco, Adam Kaplan, Katie Kreisler, Franco Maicas, and Jennifer Simard joined the cast.

The film began principal photography on April 19, 2021, and concluded on May 14, 2021, in New York City. In June 2021, the scenes were shot in White Plains, New York.

References

External links
 
 
 
 

American comedy films
Films shot in New York City
2022 comedy films
2020s American films
Roadside Attractions films
Lionsgate films